Kaia Kanepi was the defending champion, but she lost in the semifinals to Carla Suárez Navarro.

Anastasia Pavlyuchenkova won the title, defeating Suárez Navarro in the final, 7–5, 6–2.

Seeds

Draw

Finals

Top half

Bottom half

Qualifying

Seeds

Qualifiers

Lucky losers
  Monica Puig

Draw

First qualifier

Second qualifier

Third qualifier

Fourth qualifier

References
 Main Draw
 Qualifying Draw

Women's Singles
Portugal Open - Women's Singles